Alireza Jarahkar (born September 21, 1982) is an Iranian footballer.

Club career
Jarahkar joined Malavan in 2010 after spending the previous season with Shirin Faraz. Jarahkar spent the entire 2012–13 on the sidelines, due to injury, and was eventually released by Malavan on December 2012.

Club career statistics

References

1982 births
Living people
Malavan players
Shirin Faraz Kermanshah players
Iranian footballers
Machine Sazi F.C. players
Zob Ahan Esfahan F.C. players
Association football defenders
Paykan F.C. players
Mes Rafsanjan players
21st-century Iranian people